Yanna Rivoalen (born 10 June 1989) is a French female rugby union player. She represented  at the 2014 Women's Rugby World Cup. She was a member of the squad that won their fourth Six Nations title in 2014.

Rivoalen is a P.E teacher. She picked up the game of rugby in her late teens after she switched from tennis.

References

1989 births
Living people
French female rugby union players